Sakal (Marathi: सकाळ, meaning "Morning") is a Marathi-language daily newspaper by Sakal Media Group, its headquarters established in Pune, Maharashtra, India. Sakal is the flagship newspaper of the foundation publication, Sakal Media Group. It ranks among the top 10 language dailies of India and it is the largest circulated Marathi newspaper.

Pratap Govindrao Pawar has been in the board of Sakal since 1985 and is currently the chairman of the Group. According to the Audit Bureau of Circulation's (ABC) latest report, Sakal is the highest circulated and the most sold newspaper in Maharashtra with a daily circulation of approximately 1.3 million.

Dr. N. P. a.k.a. Nanasaheb Parulekar was the founder of Sakal.
It is published in the cities of Pune, Mumbai, Kolhapur, Sangli, Nashik, Aurangabad, Nanded, Parbhani, Solapur, Nagpur, Satara, Akola and Jalgaon.
The group's other operations consist of regional newspapers, magazines and Internet publishing, together employing over 3000 people. Its online website, eSakal, reaches to 300,000 Internet users across the globe

History
 
Sakal was a classic newspaper of the pre-independence nationalist period. Its idealistic founder, Dr. N.P. alias Nanasaheb Parulekar had been influenced by American newspapers during his years at Columbia University. By introducing Sakal (morning) to advance Mahatma Gandhi's movement for independence, he also showed the path to genuine daily journalism in Marathi.
Though it was started as a part of the nationalist cause, after Indian independence, Sakal newspaper established itself as a successful business by reporting on day-to-day concerns, not just of Pune but also of its rural neighborhoods. By the 1960s, Sakal appointed full-time correspondents, each with a telephone, in every town in its neighborhood. It ran training camps for its journalists, promotions and cultural events for its readers and letters to the editor on its front page. Under Nanasaheb Parulekar, the paper maintained strict political neutrality and endorsed candidates for local, state or National elections purely on the basis of their merit.

When Dr. Parulekar died in 1973, he left the paper with many good practices and rich traditions. It survived the first shocks of India's revolution in newspaper technology and carried on for more than 10 years.

Pratap Pawar took over Sakal in 1985. The Pawar family turned the paper into a public limited company in 1989, and Pratap Pawar became the managing director.

List of editors chronologically
 N. B. Parulekar – 1 January 1932 to 31 December 1943
 Ramchandra Balawant a.k.a. Babasaheb Ghorpade – 1 January 1944 to 20 February 1951
 N. B. Parulekar – 21 February 1951 to 8 January 1973
 Shridhar a.k.a. S. G. Mungekar – 9 January 1973 to 9 February 1985
 V. D. Ranade – 10 February 1985 to 30 April 1987
 S. K. Kulkarni – 1 May 1987 to 31 July 1987
 Vijay Kuwalekar – 1 August 1987 to 7 August 2000
 Anant Dixit – 8 August 2000 to 15 July 2005
 Yamaji Malkar – 16 July 2005 to 9 May 2009
 Uttam Kamble – 10 May 2009 to 31 July 2012 (Editor in Chief)
 Shriram Pawar – 1 August 2012 to 28 February 2018 (Editor in Chief)
 Rahul Gadpale – 1 March 2018 – till date (Editor in Chief)

Current status of the group 
Abhijit Pawar is currently the managing director of the group. Under his leadership, group has launched the first and only agriculture daily, Agrowon. The official website states that it is "first media company to organize events & exhibitions as well as the first media group to implement 6-sigma processes across the company." Recently the company has launched 515 agriculture marts in Maharashtra under the name of Agrowon Agrotech.

Controversies

In 2005, the Supreme Court of India directed Sakal Papers Pvt Ltd to pay Rs 3 crore to one of its directors, Claude-Lila Parulekar (daughter of founder Nanasaheb Parulekar) for illegal transfer of 3,510 of her shares in the company to Pratap Pawar's group.

Pull outs, sections and multimedia

 Today – Sakal started a separate pull out for local content. A traditional Marathi newspaper, Sakal adopted ‘Today’, an English title of the pullout. In 2006 – 2007, ‘Today’ was launched across all major cities of Maharashtra. Pune edition initiated the pull out on 14 August 2006. It opened new avenues for local content as well local advertisers.
 Garcia Design – It concentrated on multimedia activities and emerged as a Multimedia House. Newspaper designer Mario Garcia (Sr.) redesigned Sakal newspaper in year 2007–2008. The new look of Sakal was flashy, energetic and colorful. The masthead of Sakal changed to blue reverse. Garcia Design was implemented successfully across the Maharashtra.
 Newzine – In 2010 Sakal adopted Newzine style of presenting the news. Newzine is the newly coined word derived from the News in the Form of Magazine. The word Newzine is in use since 2008 – 2009. This style gives detailed view focusing future insights for the readers, besides including contents that give an edge in their quest for better practices and prosperity. It took initiatives in solving key issues affecting the people.
 Features – It has weekly supplements for the targeted sectors. Saptrang (सप्तरंग) for family (Sunday), Jobz for employment (Tuesday), Pratibimb for hyper-local content (Thursday), Family Doctor for holistic and ayurvedic approach to health (Friday) and Balmitra (बालमित्र) for children (Saturday).
 Masthead – Its masthead is dark blue in color. Earlier the masthead was black. Each Sunday it used to publish a red masthead. In the year 2008 the masthead was changed to blue reverse. Masthead has undergone many changes from style to typography. 
 Tagline – Present tagline of Daily Sakal is ‘Uday Bhavishyapatracha’ (उदय भविष्यपत्राचा). It's literally meaning is "rise of the future newspaper". The ideology behind the tagline is that the content is to consolidate its readers' awareness about the future. Earlier the tag line was ‘Mitra Navya Shatkacha’ (मित्र नव्या शतकाचा). Its literal meaning is ‘A friend of the New Century.’

Sakal's multimedia platforms are as follows.

 Mobile app – Sakal news was made available on smart mobiles through native apps. For Apple and Android
 eSakal.com—Website, www.eSakal.com also adopted a new design designed by Mario Garcia (Jr.). It added interactivity. Also, epaper facility was launched for various publications including Sakal. News updates, interactive features, citizen journalism, dialogue with the users are the key elements of the website. The website consists of epaper facility for the user.
 agrowon - Agrowon is the first newspaper for Agriculture, established on 20 April 2005.
 Agrowon.com - website : www.agrowon.com is extension of Agrowon newspaper in digital website. 
 SMS – Sakal initiated Push SMS service; Sakal Live; for its registered users. It has started 54321 SMS short-code to serve News alerts and engagement activities with its readers. Many users receive regular news updates from this service.
 Saam TV – In the year 2008, Sakal entered into the Television business With a Marathi GEC (General Entertainment Channel), Saam TV.
 3 km App: 3 km is a hyperlocal platform that connects neighborhoods allowing you to read the news from your locality, shop from local businesses & promote your business hyper-locally. It's an initiative by Sakal and Powered by Bulb and Key.
 Sarkarnama Portal – Sarkaranama is a news portal launched by Sakal Media Group in 2017.Portal is more focused on political news.

Events
Events and activities is integral part of new Sakal. It arranges events targeting Education, Agriculture, Travel-Tourism, Business etc. Its international event, ‘EDUCON’ has now become the center stage for Vice Chancellors from across the India, to present their vision about Indian higher education. Property Mahayatra, Education Mahayatra, MPL, Pune Shopping Festivals, Family Health, Sakal Shopping Festivals, Sakal Edugain, Sakal Investneet, Sakal Vastu, Sakal Shagun etc. are other some of the other events. The Group started clubs for the targeted audience events, Madhurangan (मधुरांगण) for women, Young Buzz and Sakal NIE (Newspaper in Education), Family Doctor Club are a few to mention.

Pune Bus Day
Pune bus day is an event created by Sakal Media Group. The initiative was the company managing director Abhijit Pawar's brainchild and was taken to improve traffic condition of Pune city. For Pune Bus Day, Sakal Media Group has taken an initiative to arrange 1,500 buses to the existing fleet of 1,650 PMPML buses and demonstrate how the use of optimum number of buses with high frequency can actually reduce the traffic congestion which are rampant in the city. The tagline of the initiative is 'Come, let's travel by PMPML bus on 1 November 2012'. 

Presently, the lack of sufficient buses forces commuters to opt for private vehicles thus adding to problems like traffic congestion, vehicular pollution and increasing accidents. According to a study conducted by city-based NGO Parisar in 2009–10, the bus service run by the Pune Mahanagar Parivahan Mahamandal Limited (PMPML), was the most expensive, the worst in service and had the highest breakdown rate when compared to transport utilities run in Mumbai, Chennai, Bengaluru and Delhi.

A web based portal gives information about the bus route and other details which was developed by a pune based IT company. This portal carries real time information on bus schedules as provided by the PMPML

Pune Half Marathon 
Pune Half Marathon is another popular event that falls under the Sakal Media Group's initiative. The event was incepted in 2018 with 'wellness' and 'fitness' of residents of Pune at its core. The second edition was held on 22 December 2019, and saw participation from over 20,000 runners across the country. US Olympian Janet Cherobon-Bawcom was the event ambassador for the 2019 edition that focused primarily on uplifting of the Indian running community.

The first edition in 2018 saw the race collaborating with Dr Jack Daniels, a former Olympic medalist who is regarded as the world's best running coach. One of the USP's of the race was its collaboration with Dr Daniel's The RUN Smart Project that devised free individualized training plans for the participants. Dr Daniels provided specialized training talks to the participants and also mentored the whole process contributing to the successful execution of the event. Celebrated American runner Ryan Hall was the event ambassador for Pune Half Marathon 2018

Bajaj Allianz were the title sponsors for the race in its first two editions.

Books and publications
Other publications include the English-language daily (that replaced The Maharashtra Herald), Gomantak, Gomantak Times, a Marathi, and English language dailies respectively published from the neighboring State of Goa. Agrowon, the first-ever daily dedicated to agriculture and farming. Apart from these main issues, many supplements are issued from Sakal Media Group like Pratibimb, Young Buzz, positive(Financial supplement), Job Buzz, etc.
Sakal also publishes several books each month. It has a book publishing division ranging from a variety of sections such as health, entertainment, sports, spiritual, children, etc. ‘Ayurvediya Garbhsanskar’ by Shri. Balaji Tambe;  ‘Timeless Inspirator’ edited by Dr. Raghunath Mashelkar, a comic strip book of Chintoo are some of the popular titles published by this division.

Sakal Social Foundation
 
A social wing for the welfare of the society, Sakal Social Foundation works mainly in Maharashtra. 
Health, poverty, education, environment, governance are some of its prime areas of work.

Magazines
Sakal Group has variety of magazines. Sakal Saptahik (सकाळ साप्ताहिक). Sakal Saptahik stands at top in IRS (Indian Readership Survey). Tanishka (तनिष्का) is a monthly magazine targeting women readers. Premier (प्रीमियर) is the entertainment magazine publishes ins and outs of entertainment industry every month.

References

Marathi-language newspapers
Publications established in 1932
Newspapers published in Maharashtra
Mass media in Pune
Mass media in Nagpur
1932 establishments in India